A list of Christian saints and blesseds in chronological order, sorted by date of death:

1st century (1-100)
2nd century (101-200)
3rd century (201-300)
4th century (301-400)
5th century (401-500)
6th century (501-600)
7th century (601-700)
8th century (701-800)
9th century (801-900)
10th century (901-1000)
11th century (1001-1100)
12th century (1101-1200)
13th century (1201-1300)
14th century (1301-1400)
15th century (1401-1500)
16th century (1501-1600)
17th century (1601-1700)
18th century (1701-1800)
19th century (1801-1900)
20th century (1901-2000)
21st century (2001-2100)